Bhukhi River is a river in western India in Gujarat whose origin is Near Angia village. Its basin has a maximum length of 28 km. The total catchment area of the basin is 56 km2.

References

Rivers of Gujarat
Rivers of India